Juan Manuel López Martinez (born 3 September 1969) is a Spanish retired footballer who played mainly as a central defender (occasionally he could operate in the flanks).

López was prone to suspensions, often being considered overaggressive in his approach. Having spent his entire career with Atlético Madrid, he retired after sustaining a serious knee injury.

Club career
López was born in Madrid. During his professional career he played solely for Atlético Madrid, his debut with the first team coming in the dying stages of 1990–91 as he was still registered for the reserves, and would be the following season.

During the 1995–96 campaign, López, often dubbed Super López, formed a solid centre-back partnership with another Atlético graduate, Roberto Solozábal, as the capital club achieved an historic double, with the former appearing in 32 La Liga matches with two goals, in home wins against Real Oviedo (3–0) and CD Tenerife (3–1).

From 1997 to 2001 (with the last season being played in the Segunda División), however, consistent injuries limited the often considered over-aggressive player to just 12 games, and he eventually retired due to an anterior cruciate ligament ailment from which he never fully recovered.

López subsequently worked as a football agent.

International career
For Spain, López won the gold medal in the 1992 Summer Olympics in Barcelona, and participated at UEFA Euro 1996, receiving 11 full caps in a five-year span. His senior debut came on 9 September 1992 in a friendly 1–0 win against England in Santander, also the first for coach Javier Clemente – both López and Solozábal played the entire match.

Honours
Atlético Madrid
La Liga: 1995–96
Copa del Rey: 1991–92, 1995–96

Spain U23
Summer Olympic Games: 1992

See also
List of one-club men

References

External links

1969 births
Living people
Spanish footballers
Footballers from Madrid
Association football defenders
La Liga players
Segunda División players
Segunda División B players
Atlético Madrid B players
Atlético Madrid footballers
Spain under-23 international footballers
Spain international footballers
UEFA Euro 1996 players
Olympic footballers of Spain
Footballers at the 1992 Summer Olympics
Olympic gold medalists for Spain
Olympic medalists in football
Medalists at the 1992 Summer Olympics
Association football agents